Louis-Philippe Hébert  (1850–1917) was a Canadian sculptor. He is considered one of the best sculptors of his generation.

Career
Hébert was the son of Théophile Hébert, a farmer, and Julie Bourgeois of Ste-Sophie de Mégantic, Quebec. At age 19, he enrolled as a Papal Zouave and left for Italy where he found the art an eye-opener. The trip had a major impact on his career. Back in Canada, in 1872, he was initiated in making sculpture in wood by Adolphe Rho at Bécancour, then was mentored by Napoléon Bourassa in new approaches to sculpture in Canada. Hébert sculpted forty monuments, busts, medals and statues in wood, bronze and terra-cotta and taught at the Conseil des arts et manufactures in Montreal, Quebec. He married Maria Roy on 26 May 1879 in Montreal, Quebec. The couple's eight children include Henri Hébert, a sculptor, and Adrien Hébert, a painter.

Hébert was an associate member of the Royal Canadian Academy of Arts (1880 and 1895), a full member in 1886-1889 and 1906. At the Exposition universelle de Paris in 1889, Hébert received a bronze medal, the first for a Canadian artist. He also was awarded the Medal of Confederation (1894) and was made a chevalier of France's Legion of Honour (1901), as well as a Companion of St Michael and St George (Great Britain, 1903). The Prix Philippe-Hébert, named in his honour, has been given to an artist of outstanding ability and stature in Québec arts by the St-Jean-Baptiste Society of Montréal since 1971. He was buried in Notre-Dame-des-Neiges cemetery, Montreal, Quebec.

Works

Parliament Hill, Ottawa

Nova Scotia

Quebec Parliament Building

Montreal, Quebec

Maisonneuve Monument

Other

Monseigneur Bourget in Montreal, Quebec.
Monseigneur de Laval in Quebec, Quebec.
completed thirty large wooden sculptures in the choir of the Notre-Dame Cathedral Basilica, Ottawa including the  Holy Family, John the Baptist and Patrick, the patron saints of English and French Catholics.
monument at Parliament Hill (Quebec City) to soldiers Short and Wallick (1891), two heroes who saved the inhabitants of the fire at Saint-Sauveur in the lower town of Quebec in 1889)
monument of Father André Garin, priest at St.-Jean-Baptiste Church, at Lowell, Massachusetts.

References

External links

 
 Canadian Encyclopedia : Louis-Philippe Hébert
 Louis-Philippe Hébert photos by George Lessard

1850 births
1917 deaths
Canadian Companions of the Order of St Michael and St George
Chevaliers of the Légion d'honneur
20th-century Canadian sculptors
Canadian male sculptors
20th-century male artists
19th-century Canadian sculptors
19th-century male artists
Burials at Notre Dame des Neiges Cemetery
Members of the Royal Canadian Academy of Arts